Plamen Asparukhov (born 8 May 1960) is a Bulgarian weightlifter. He competed in the men's heavyweight I event at the 1980 Summer Olympics.

References

1960 births
Living people
Bulgarian male weightlifters
Olympic weightlifters of Bulgaria
Weightlifters at the 1980 Summer Olympics
Sportspeople from Pernik
World Weightlifting Championships medalists
20th-century Bulgarian people